Steffan Thomas (born 27 April 1997) is a Welsh rugby union player, currently playing for Pro14 and European Rugby Champions Cup side Scarlets. His preferred position is prop.

Scarlets
Thomas made his Scarlets debut in Round 2 of the 2017–18 Anglo-Welsh Cup against the Exeter Chiefs. He has remained in the Scarlets squad since making a further two appearances, signing a contract extension in August 2020.

His cousin is Ospreys loosehead prop Gareth Thomas.

References

External links
itsrugby.co.uk Profile

1997 births
Living people
Welsh rugby union players
Scarlets players
Rugby union props
Rugby union players from Carmarthen